Thomas Frazer was the 2nd Civil Auditor and Accountant General of Ceylon. 
He was appointed in September 1799, succeeding Cecil Smith, and held the office until 29 September 1802. He was succeeded by Robert Boyd.

References

Auditors General of Sri Lanka
British colonial governors and administrators in Asia
Year of birth missing
Year of death missing